Peter Paduh (born 1977 in Sarajevo) is Bosnian-born British businessman and social entrepreneur. He is best known as the Young Business Person of the Year at the London Business Awards 2005, and for his involvement with the Computers for Older People Initiative with the Mayor of London and Age Concern and as a spokesperson for Refugees in the UK and for Corporate Social Responsibility (CSR).

Biography 
He came to the UK as a refugee in his early teens when war broke out in the Balkans. At the time he did not speak English, but wanted to have a positive contribution to society and establish a successful business.

Paduh learnt English, lived in a children's home for refugees in London and attended school and university in the UK. He worked for companies such as Gateway and Microsoft, then started a series of businesses.

In 2002, as a result of consultations with his clients, Paduh began researching the business potential of the electronic waste problem. His research took him to North America, where he made a number of contacts, visited reuse and recycling plants and observed the thriving reuse and recycling industry there.

His approach to business was built on the principles of practical corporate social responsibility (CSR), providing training in IT hardware for young unemployed people and helping disadvantaged groups such as older people in the UK with refurbished PCs. Paduh demonstrated that it was possible to establish a successful business that is environmentally and socially sustainable.

He received the most prestigious was as the Young Business Person of the Year at the London Business Awards 2005 sponsored by ITV London and the London Chamber of Commerce.

Social enterprise 
Paduh is currently chairman of SocialBox.Biz, a new generation social impact consultancy agency with emphasis on digital inclusion, tech innovation and integration of refugees and homeless people.

He helped setup other ventures in the technology sector that worked with the local community on initiatives such as the reuse of IT equipment that London businesses were replacing helping create employment opportunities in London. In this process, training was provided to young people in IT hardware including immigrants and other former refugees. These ventures reused thousands of computers from firms and put them back into use in the charity voluntary sector benefiting from the services.

Works 
Originally a refugee, Peter's story has been covered on The Guardian, the Financial Times and Newsweek, and was the subject of a two-page spread in the London Paper. Paduh has also been featured on ITV news, BBC World, on the BBC's Working Lunch and  Times Radio programme.

Awards and recognitions 

Institute of Directors – The Good Director Honour award winner
Winner HSBC Startup Stars – London
National Business Awards – Chairman Award for Innovation
The Edge Employers Awards – London Region Winner
Young Business Person of the Year award winner London Business Awards
London Mayor's Award for Outstanding contribution to life in London.
Best Corporate Social Responsibility firms Haringey City Growth Award winner

References

External links
SocialBox.biz a Social Impact Consultancy London UK

1977 births
Living people
Bosnia and Herzegovina emigrants to England
Bosnia and Herzegovina refugees
Businesspeople from London
Refugees in the United Kingdom
Yugoslav Wars refugees